Luis de Carlos Ortiz (16 March 1907 – 27 May 1994) was a Spanish football administrator who was the 12th president of Real Madrid from September 1978 until 24 May 1985.

De Carlos was elected president of Real Madrid after the death of Santiago Bernabéu. Under his leadership, the club won two league titles, two Spanish Cups, one League Cup, and one UEFA Cup, but fell short of clinching its seventh European Cup after a 0–1 loss to Liverpool in the 1981 final, and its first European Cup Winners' Cup following the defeat to Aberdeen in the 1983 final.

He did not run in the elections of 1985 and was succeeded by Ramón Mendoza at the helm of the club.

References

1907 births
1994 deaths
People from Madrid
Spanish sports executives and administrators
Real Madrid CF presidents